Wat Sing is a district (amphoe) in the northern part of Chai Nat province, central Thailand.

Geography
Neighboring districts are (from the northeast clockwise) Manorom, Mueang Chai Nat, Hankha and Nong Mamong of Chai Nat Province; Nong Khayang and Mueang Uthai Thani of Uthai Thani province.

Administration
The district is divided into seven sub-districts (tambons), which are further subdivided into 47 villages (mubans). Wat Sing is a sub-district municipality (thesaban tambon) which covers tambon Wat Sing. There are a further six tambon administrative organizations (TAO).

Missing numbers are tambon which now form Nong Mamong District.

References

External links
amphoe.com (Thai)	

Wat Sing